Solder is a metallic material that is used to connect metal workpieces. The choice of specific solder alloys depends on their melting point, chemical reactivity, mechanical properties, toxicity, and other properties. Hence a wide range of solder alloys exist, and only major ones are listed below. Since early 2000s the use of lead in solder alloys is discouraged by several governmental guidelines in the European Union, Japan and other countries, such as Restriction of Hazardous Substances Directive and Waste Electrical and Electronic Equipment Directive.

Solder alloys

Notes on the above table 

In the Sn-Pb alloys, tensile strength increases with increasing tin content. Indium-tin alloys with high indium content have very low tensile strength.

For soldering semiconductor materials, e.g. die attachment of silicon, germanium and gallium arsenide, it is important that the solder contains no impurities that could cause doping in the wrong direction. For soldering n-type semiconductors, solder may be doped with antimony; indium may be added for soldering p-type semiconductors. Pure tin can also be used.

Various fusible alloys can be used as solders with very low melting points; examples include Field's metal, Lipowitz's alloy, Wood's metal, and Rose's metal.

Properties 
The thermal conductivity of common solders ranges from 30 to 400 W/(m·K), and the density from 9.25 to 15.00 g/cm3.

References

External links 

 Phase diagrams of different types of solder alloys

Fusible alloys
Soldering
Lead alloys